Marco Micheli (born 1983) is an Italian astronomer and a discoverer of minor planets. He is a researcher at the Centre for Earth Observation of ESAs Space Situational Awareness Programme in Italy.

Career 

Micheli was born in Brescia, Italy, in 1983. He graduated in 2007 in astronomy and astrophysics at the University of Pisa with a thesis on the YORP effect, and moved for his doctorate to the University of Hawaii where he studied Near-Earth objects and how their streams cause meteor showers. He then moved to ESA's Centre for Earth Observation in Frascati, Italy.

As a member of the Pan-STARRS astronomical survey team, he holds the record of new asteroids detected in a single night since 29 January 2011. According to the Minor Planet Center (MPC) he discovered between 2005 and 2010 twelve asteroids, partly in collaboration with Wladimiro Marinello and Gianpaolo Pizzetti (see list).

In June 2018 he published a study on 1I/ʻOumuamua, the first Interstellar object, where the discovery of a non-gravitational acceleration acting on the object is reported. This suggests that the celestial body may be a comet, although it has not shown any noticeable activity in the visual spectrum during transit in the Solar System.

List of discovered minor planets

Awards and honors 

Asteroid 10277 Micheli, discovered by American astronomer Schelte Bus at the Siding Spring Observatory in 1981, was named in his honor. The official  was published by the MPC on 13 April 2017.

See also

References

External links 
 Scigraph

1983 births
Living people
People from Brescia

Discoverers of minor planets